The Erie War was a 19th-century conflict between American financiers for control of the Erie Railway Company, which owned and operated the Erie Railroad. Built with public funds raised by taxation and on land donated by public officials and private developers, by the middle of the 1850s the railroad was mismanaged and heavily in debt. A cattle drover turned Wall Street banker and broker, Daniel Drew, at first loaned $2 million to the railroad, and then acquired control over it. He amassed a fortune by skillfully manipulating the Erie railroad shares on the New York Stock Exchange. Cornelius Vanderbilt, who set his mind on building a railroad empire, saw multiple business and financial opportunities in railways and decided in 1866 to corner the market on Erie by silently scooping-up the Erie railroad stock. After succeeding, Vanderbilt permitted Drew to stay on the board of directors in his former capacity as treasurer.

Watered-down stocks
Between 1866-1868, Daniel Drew conspired with James Fisk and Jay Gould, whom he brought on the board, to issue spurious Erie Railroad shares, thus "watering down" the stock, of which unsuspecting Cornelius Vanderbilt bought a large quantity. Vanderbilt lost more than $7 million in his attempt to gain control over Erie Railway Company, although Gould later returned most of the money under threat of litigation. As a result, Vanderbilt conceded control of the railroad to the trio. They were involved with the corrupt Tammany Hall political party machine, and made Boss Tweed a director of the Erie Railroad. Tweed (who later died in prison for embezzlement and fraud), in return, arranged favorable state legislation in Albany for them, legalizing the newly issued shares.

   
Gustavus Myers, an American historian and muckraker, wrote in his survey of railroad fortunes in the U.S.

Fisk and Gould betrayed Drew, again manipulating the Erie Railroad stock price and causing him to lose $1.5 million. The Panic of 1873 cost him still more, and by 1876, Drew filed for bankruptcy, with debts exceeding a million dollars and no viable assets. He died in 1879, dependent on his son for support.

After Fisk was murdered in 1872, Gould eventually gained the advantage in the conflict, but he had to relinquish control in 1872-73, following his loss of $1 million worth of Erie Railroad stock to the British confidence man Lord Gordon-Gordon. Public opinion was also hostile to Gould because of his involvement in the 1869 Black Friday stock market crash. In 1878, after all financial swindles and due to continuing mismanagement, the Erie Railway Company declared bankruptcy and was reconstituted as the New York, Lake Erie and Western Railway Company.

See also
Albany and Susquehanna Railroad
George G. Barnard - State judge working mostly on behalf of Fisk and Gould, impeached by the Court for the Trial of Impeachments 
Rufus Wheeler Peckham
"A New War Begins" episode of The Men Who Built America

References

Further reading
Gordon, John Steele. The Scarlet Woman of Wall Street: Jay Gould, Jim Fisk, Cornelius Vanderbilt, the Erie Railway Wars, and the Birth of Wall Street. New York: Weidenfeld & Nicolson, 1988. (A very readable and entertaining, but detailed and well-researched, history of the 'Erie War'.)
Hicks, Frederick C., and Charles Francis Adams. High Finance in the Sixties; Chapters from the Early History of the Erie Railway. Port Washington, N.Y.: Kennikat Press, 1966.
Myers, Gustavus. History of the Great American Fortunes. Volume 2. Chicago: Charles H. Kerr & Co., 1910
 

War
Stock market
William M. Tweed